Charan Dass Sidhu (born 14 March 1938 – 18 November 2013, Bham, Hoshiarpur (district), Punjab British India) was a Punjabi playwright and author.

Books and plays 
Merā nāṭakī safara	 
Pañja khūha wāle ḍarāmā	 
Alexander's victory	 
Amānata dī lāṭhī : nāṭaka	 
Ambīāṃ nūṃ taraseṅgī	 
Bābā Bantū nāṭaka	 
Bhagat Singh shahīd : tīn ḍrāme	 
Bhagata Siṅgha shahīda : nāṭaka tikkaṛī	 
Bhajano
Ghalib-e-Azam

Awards
Sidhu won the Sahitya Akademi Award in 2003 for Bhagat Singh Shahid : Natak Tikri (Play).

See also
List of Sahitya Akademi Award winners for Punjabi

References

20th-century Indian dramatists and playwrights
Punjabi-language writers
Punjabi people
Recipients of the Sahitya Akademi Award in Punjabi
20th-century Indian novelists
Novelists from Punjab, India
Dramatists and playwrights from Punjab, India